J & H Ritchie Ltd v Lloyd Ltd [2007] UKHL 9 is a Scottish contract law case, concerning the measure of damages for breach.

Facts
Mr Ritchie has a business (J&H Ritchie Ltd) on North Arkleston Farm, Paisley. He bought an all in one seed drill and harrow from Lloyd Ltd, based at Hunters Hall, Kelso. It was advertised at a reduced price because it had been repossessed from the previous owner. It did not work. Lloyd Ltd agreed to take it back, investigate, and repair it. Lloyd Ltd returned it, but refused to say what the problem had been, and just said it had been repaired to "factory gate" standard. Mr Ritchie found out informally that two bearings for the rotors of the harrow had been missing. This was a serious defect. Mr Ritchie was concerned that when he had used it, further damage may have been caused, and he would not find out, because he would only start using it the next Spring. He was worried that by this time the manufacturer's guarantee would be affected. So Mr Ritchie rejected the machine.

The question was whether rejecting the equipment was permissible under s 35(6)(a) of the Sale of Goods Act 1979. This provides,

Judgment
The House of Lords all agreed that Mr Ritchie was entitled to reject the equipment, even though it had in fact been repaired. Furthermore, Lloyd Ltd were in breach of a separate "inspection and repair agreement" by refusing to say what had been wrong with it. This had arisen when the machinery was taken away. It had to have been an implied term of that agreement that, so long as Lloyd Ltd were performing its duties, Mr Ritchie would not rescind the contract. Mr Ritchie would lose his right to reject the goods. But he could only make that choice when he was fully informed. The law has shown that this is correct.

Lord Hope's opinion went as follows,

See also
English contract law

Notes

External links
Full judgment from the House of Lords page

Scottish contract case law
House of Lords cases
2007 in case law
2007 in British law